"Play Me" is a song by Neil Diamond, covered by Gene Ammons 1973, Lloyd Charmers 1974 Marcia Griffiths

Play Me may also refer to:
Play Me (album) Harry Belafonte
Play Me album by Eve (Korean band)
Play Me Nas discography
 "Play Me", a song by Korn from Take a Look in the Mirror